Godlike may refer to:
Divine, having the characteristics of a deity
Godlike (album), a 2002 album by Natas
Godlike (role-playing game), an alternate history World War II era superhero role-playing game
"Godlike" (song), a 1990 song by KMFDM

See also